Giovanni Maria Butteri (1540–1606), also known as Giovanmaria Butteri, was an Italian painter of the Mannerist period, active in his native Florence.

He was a pupil of Alessandro Allori and Francesco Salviati. He participated in the fresco decoration of the large cloister at Santa Maria Novella. Other works can be found at the churches of Santa Monica and San Barnaba in Florence, as well as in the Civic Museum in Prato. He also contributed a canvas for the programme of the Studiolo of Francesco I in the Palazzo Vecchio: a visit by Prince Francesco I de'Medici to Bortolo d'Alvise's glassworks.

References

External links

1540 births
1606 deaths
16th-century Italian painters
Italian male painters
17th-century Italian painters
Painters from Florence
Italian Mannerist painters